Wharton County is a county located in the U.S. state of Texas. As of the 2020 census, its population was 41,570. Its county seat is Wharton. The county was named for brothers William Harris Wharton and John Austin Wharton.

Wharton County comprises the El Campo, TX Micropolitan Statistical Area, which is also included in the Houston-The Woodlands, TX Combined Statistical Area.

Geography

Adjacent counties
 Austin County (north)
 Fort Bend County (northeast)
 Brazoria County (east)
 Matagorda County (southeast)
 Jackson County (southwest)
 Colorado County (northwest)

Demographics

Note: the US Census treats Hispanic/Latino as an ethnic category. This table excludes Latinos from the racial categories and assigns them to a separate category. Hispanics/Latinos can be of any race.

As of the census of 2000, there were 41,188 people, 14,799 households, and 10,744 families residing in the county.  The population density was 38 people per square mile (15/km2).  There were 16,606 housing units at an average density of 15 per square mile (6/km2).  The racial makeup of the county was 69.01% White, 14.95% Black or African American, 0.37% Native American, 0.31% Asian, 0.06% Pacific Islander, 13.65% from other races, and 1.64% from two or more races.  31.29% of the population were Hispanic or Latino of any race. 12.8% were of Czech, 11.0% German and 7.0% American ancestry according to Census 2000. 73.8% spoke English, 24.0% Spanish and 2.0% Czech as their first language.

There were 14,799 households, out of which 35.70% had children under the age of 18 living with them, 55.50% were married couples living together, 12.50% had a female householder with no husband present, and 27.40% were non-families. 24.40% of all households were made up of individuals, and 12.40% had someone living alone who was 65 years of age or older.  The average household size was 2.73 and the average family size was 3.26.

In the county, the population was spread out, with 28.70% under the age of 18, 9.30% from 18 to 24, 26.50% from 25 to 44, 21.50% from 45 to 64, and 13.90% who were 65 years of age or older.  The median age was 35 years. For every 100 females there were 96.90 males.  For every 100 females age 18 and over, there were 92.70 males.

The median income for a household in the county was $32,208, and the median income for a family was $39,919. Males had a median income of $30,480 versus $20,101 for females. The per capita income for the county was $15,388.  About 13.30% of families and 16.50% of the population were below the poverty line, including 18.50% of those under age 18 and 17.70% of those age 65 or over.

Legacy of slavery
A map commissioned by the United States government in the 1860s, and sold by the Union Army for the benefit of wounded troops, indicates that, based on data from the 1860 national census, 80.9% of the population of Wharton County was enslaved. The county then had a total of 3,380 people. This was the highest proportion of slaves in a single county in the state of Texas. Demand related to development of new areas for cultivation had caused the number of slaves overall in the state to triple between 1850 and 1860, from 58,000 to 182,566.

Transportation

Airports
El Campo Metropolitan Airport, a general aviation airport, is located in unincorporated Wharton County southwest of El Campo.

Wharton Regional Airport, also a general aviation airport, is located in the extreme southwestern portion of Wharton.

Major highways
  U.S. Highway 59
  Interstate 69 is currently under construction and will follow the current route of U.S. 59 in most places.
  U.S. Highway 90 Alternate
  State Highway 60
  State Highway 71
  Farm to Market Road 102
  Farm to Market Road 442
  Farm to Market Road 1160
  Farm to Market Road 1300

Politics
Wharton County is a strongly Republican county in the 21st century.

Communities

Cities
 East Bernard
 El Campo
 Wharton (county seat)

Census-designated places
 Boling
 Hungerford
 Iago
 Louise

Unincorporated communities

 Bonus
 Burr
 Danevang
 Egypt
 Elm Grove
 Glen Flora
 Hahn
 Hillje
 Lane City
 Lissie
 Mackay
 Magnet
 Newgulf
 New Taiton
 Pierce
 Sand Ridge
 Spanish Camp

Ghost towns

 Don-Tol
 Nottawa
 Peach Creek
 Plainview
 Preston
 Round Mott
 Taiton
 Waterville

See also

 Congregation Shearith Israel
 List of museums in the Texas Gulf Coast
 National Register of Historic Places listings in Wharton County, Texas
 Recorded Texas Historic Landmarks in Wharton County
 20th Century Technology Museum

References

External links

 Danish Heritage Preservation Society
 Wharton County government's website
 
 Wharton County Sheriff's Office

 
1846 establishments in Texas
Populated places established in 1846
Majority-minority counties in Texas